Greg Schulte is an American sportscaster, and is best known as the radio play-by-play voice of the Arizona Diamondbacks Major League Baseball team, a position he has held since the team's inaugural season in 1998. Schulte's nickname is The Gub'nuh (like "The Governor" with an exaggerated English accent). He is known for his unique home run call,  "Deep drive..warning track..wall..you can touch 'em all (player's name). Schulte's voice will forever be linked with one of baseball's greatest moments as he delivered the call of Luis Gonzalez's ninth-inning single to win Game 7 of the 2001 World Series. 

Schulte called his 3,000th Diamondbacks game on April 19, 2017.

Schulte also covered the Phoenix Suns for many years, where he first produced the broadcasts, and later served as a color commentator to Al McCoy.

Schulte was the original pre-game and post-game host for the Arizona Cardinals.

In February 2023, the Diamondbacks announced that Schulte would retire at the end of the 2023 season.

References

External links
Team website 
Extension through 2011

Year of birth missing (living people)
Living people
American radio sports announcers
Arizona Cardinals announcers
Arizona Diamondbacks announcers
College basketball announcers in the United States
Major League Baseball broadcasters
National Basketball Association broadcasters
National Football League announcers
Phoenix Suns announcers